The Korean Cultural Center Los Angeles (KCCLA) is an annex of the Consulate General of the Republic of Korea in Los Angeles  and is operated by the South Korean government's Ministry of Culture, Sports and Tourism.

 KCCLA's mission is to broaden Korea-U.S. relations through cultural and educational activities. KCCLA is located in Los Angeles, California.

History
1980: Korean Cultural Center of Los Angeles was founded on April 11, 1980.

1992: The area around was burned in the Rodney King riots, while the center was protected by armed guards.

2001: Reopening of remodeled KCCLA Library on May 24, 2001.

2006: Collaborated organization with the Korean Government's Ministry of Culture and Tourism, and the Korean Culture & Content Agency.

Facilities
 Folk Museum – The museum features a permanent exhibition titled, "Emerging Country in East Asia - Elegant Life of the Noble Class during the Joseon Period." Visitors get a glimpse into the lives of Korean Confucian aristocracy through the traditional sarangbang (husband's quarter) and anbang (wife's quarter) rooms. A variety of traditional crafts, embroidery and relics are also on display.
 Art Gallery – The second floor features a gallery with several exhibits each year of local and internationally renowned artists in both traditional and contemporary art.
 Library – The library features more than 17,000 books, videotapes, DVDs, and CDs.  Both in English and Korean.
  Auditorium – The Ari Hall is a venue for movies, lectures and presentations.
 The Exhibitions features historical pieces for display based on reference to Korea.

See also
 Korean Art
 Culture of Korea

Notes

External links
 Official Korean Cultural Center—KCCLA website

Art museums and galleries in Los Angeles
Asian art museums in California
Ethnic museums in California
Korean-American culture in Los Angeles
Museums established in 1980
Museums in Los Angeles